James Graham Black (June 22, 1889 – June 29, 1957) was an American politician in the state of Florida. He served in the Florida State Senate from 1953 to 1955 as a Democratic member for the 17th district.

References

1889 births
1957 deaths
Democratic Party Florida state senators
People from Bamberg, South Carolina
Pork Chop Gang
20th-century American politicians